Tanzania is a genus of jumping spiders that was first described by A. Ö. Koçak & M. Kemal in 2008. Both sexes look alike, but the females are sometimes darker. It is related to the Euophrys and Talavera.
Three new species discovered in Tanzania by Wesolowska and Russell-Smith in 2000, and given the genus name "Lilliput" (L. mkomazienis, L. minutus and L. pusillus) are now included in the genus Tanzania.

Species
As of October 2022, it contains seven species, six of which are found in Africa and one in India:
Tanzania meridionalis Haddad & Wesolowska, 2011 – South Africa
Tanzania minutus (Wesolowska & Russell-Smith, 2000) – Tanzania, South Africa
Tanzania mkomaziensis (Wesolowska & Russell-Smith, 2000) (type) – Nigeria, Ethiopia, Tanzania, South Africa
Tanzania parvulus Wesolowska, Azarkina & Russell-Smith, 2014 – South Africa
Tanzania pusillus (Wesolowska & Russell-Smith, 2000) – Tanzania
Tanzania striatus Wesolowska, Azarkina & Russell-Smith, 2014 – South Africa
Tanzania yellapragadai Prajapati & Dudhatra, 2022 - India

References

External links
 Diagnostic drawings of the three species

Salticidae genera
Salticidae
Spiders of Africa